The first Pan American Games in Buenos Aires in 1951 included weightlifting competitions in various weight categories. The U.S. athlete John Davis won the super-heavyweight event.

Men's competition

Bantamweight (− 56 kg)

Featherweight (− 60 kg)

Lightweight (− 67.5 kg)

Middleweight (− 75 kg)

Light-heavyweight (− 82.5 kg)

Super heavyweight (90 kg)

Medal table

References 
  .
 
 

1951
Weightlifting
Pan American Games
1951 Pan American Games